Province was the largest territorial  subdivision in medieval and Renaissance-era Poland, and later in the Polish–Lithuanian Commonwealth. The term designated each of the two largest constituents of the state: depending on the period, including Greater Poland, Lesser Poland and (upon the formation of the Commonwealth) the Grand Duchy of Lithuania. Ducal Prussia was often counted as part of the Greater Poland; Livonia as part of the Grand Duchy of Lithuania, and the Ruthenian territories were split between Lesser Poland and the Grand Duchy.

Though larger than a voivodeship (województwo), the prowincja was less important in terms of offices and power. In most respects, it was merely a titular unit of administration. The real power lay with the voivodeship—and, to a lesser extent, with ziemias (lands).

The Polish term "prowincja" has not been used to denote any part of independent Poland since the Third Partition of the Polish–Lithuanian Commonwealth (1795)—unlike "ziemia", which has continued to be used for certain geographical areas.  Since 1795, the Polish word "prowincja" has been used only for certain foreign-imposed units of administration within territories of the old Polish–Lithuanian Commonwealth.

See also
Administrative division of the Polish–Lithuanian Commonwealth
Testament of Bolesław III Krzywousty
Regions of Poland

Notes 

Subdivisions of Poland
Types of administrative division